Nafisat Abdulrahman Abdullahi is a Nigerian actress, film producer, director, and entrepreneur. Born into the family of Abdulrahman Abdullahi, an elder statesman who deals in Car business.

Education and early life 
Abdullahi is the fourth daughter in a family of four to Abdulrahman Abdullahi and Zainab Abdullah, her siblings are Fatima Abdullahi, Muhammad Abdullahi, Asma’u Abdullahi.

She had her primary education in a Airforce Private School in Jos. She attended Government Girls Secondary School Dutse in Abuja. And went on to further her education at the University of Jos with a degree in Theatre Art. Abdullahi also have a professional education in Photography at the London School of Photography in London, Egland.

In 2010, Abdullahi started her career at the age of 18 in her first movie (sai wata rana). The movie rose her fame which she played her role alongside other actors like Ali Nuhu, Adam A Zango, and Fati Washa.

Business 
Abdullahi run two business outside her acting career. Her makeup brand is one among them, it was launched in July, 2021

Suspension 
In June 2013, she was suspended by a disciplinary committee of Arewa Filmmakers Association of Nigeria for failing to appear before the committee after being summoned for organizing a banned event by the followers of the Hausa movie industry. She was handed two years suspension by the disciplinary committee which was lifted in August 2013.

She went on to participate in Aminu Saira's Kalamu Wahid and Ya Daga Allah in 2014.

Ambassador 
Abdullahi got an endorsement with a real estate company called TPumpy, in Abuja.  Late 2021 Abdullahi signed another contract with pepsi.

Filmography 
 Addini ko Al’Ada
 Allo
 Yar Agadez
 Ban Kasheta Ba
 Ya daga Allah
 Blood and Henna
 Ummi
 Baban Sadik
 Dawo Dawo
 Alhaki Kwikwiyo
 Farar Saka
 Cikin Waye?
 Dan Marayan Zaki
 Zango
 Gabar Cikin Gida
 Alkawarina
 Har Abada
 Dan Almajiri
 Laifin Dadi
 Alhini
 Madubin Dubawa
 Badi Ba Rai
 Fataken Dare
 Baiwar Allah
 Lamiraj
 Dare
 Guguwar So
 Haaja
 Jari Hujja

Awards

References

Year of birth missing (living people)
Living people
Actresses in Hausa cinema
21st-century Nigerian actresses
People from Jos
Nigerian film actresses
Nigerian film producers
Nigerian film directors
Nigerian women in business
Nigerian film award winners
Nigerian women film producers
Nigerian women film directors
Kannywood actors
Nigerian television personalities
Nigerian television actresses